The 1925 Forest of Dean by-election was held on 14 July 1925.  The by-election was held due to the death of the incumbent Labour MP, James Wignall.  It was won by the Labour candidate A. A. Purcell.

References

Forest of Dean by-election
Forest of Dean
Forest of Dean by-election
By-elections to the Parliament of the United Kingdom in Gloucestershire constituencies
20th century in Gloucestershire
Forest of Dean by-election